Pitthea is a genus of moths in the family Geometridae erected by Francis Walker in 1854.

Species
Some species of this genus are:

Pitthea agenoria Druce, 1890
Pitthea argentiplaga Warren, 1897
Pitthea caesarea Rebel, 1914
Pitthea continua Walker, 1854
Pitthea cunaxa Druce, 1887
Pitthea cyanomeris L. B. Prout, 1915
Pitthea eximia Druce, 1910
Pitthea famula Drury, 1773
Pitthea flavimargo Druce, 1910 
Pitthea fractimacula Warren, 1897
Pitthea fuliginosa Druce, 1910
Pitthea hypomima L. B. Prout, 1922
Pitthea ichnolepida Herbulot, 1973
Pitthea mungi (Plötz, 1880)
Pitthea neavei L. B. Prout, 1915
Pitthea perspicua (Linnaeus, 1758)
Pitthea rubriplaga Warren, 1897 
Pitthea sospes L. B. Prout, 1921
Pitthea subflaveola Bethune-Baker, 1911
Pitthea syndroma L. B. Prout, 1932
Pitthea trifasciata Dewitz, 1881

References
 

Ennominae